is a one-on-one fighting arcade game developed by Psikyo in 1993 and released as well as published under Jaleco's partnership in Japan for the arcades in 1994.

Gameplay

The game focuses mostly on reality fighting rather than fictional fighting. At the start of the game in one-player mode, the player will face against the other fighter that uses the same fighting style as the one the player chose. After the player wins against the opponent, the player will face against other opponents that use other fighting styles in the K-Road Tournament. If the player loses, the game will only allow the player to continue fighting through it with the character he used, and will not allow the player to choose another character.

The gameplay has a 6-button layout, but with command inputs different compared to ones in most fighting games released at the time. There are three punches and kicks for a few directions (weak, medium and strong). There are seven fighting styles featured in the game and two playable characters per style, for a total of 14 playable fighters.

Fighters

Karate
 Anthony Hawk
 Masamichi Ohyama

Boxing
 Rick Simpson
 Jeff Howard

Muay Thai
 Shinsaku Maekawa
 John Anderson

Commando sambo
 Wolf
 Dan

Mixed martial arts
Cyborg D-9F
 Cyborg T-8P

Sumo
 Mitsuji Tanimachi
 Harimaoh

Jujutsu
 Tyssa Willing
 Yuki Fujiwara

Other
Mr. Bear - The final boss of the game. Some of his moves resemble Ryu's from Capcom's Street Fighter series.

Reception 
In Japan, Game Machine listed Battle K-Road on their March 1, 1994 issue as being the tenth most-successful table arcade unit of the month.

See also
List of fighting games

References

External links
Battle K-Road at The Large Cult Fighting Game March 

Battle K-Road at arcade-history
Battle K-Road can be played for free in the browser on the Internet Archive

1994 video games
Arcade video games
Arcade-only video games
Psikyo games
Fighting games
Video games developed in Japan
Jaleco games
Multiplayer and single-player video games